Pyreferra ceromatica, the anointed sallow moth, is a species of moth native to North America. In the US state of Connecticut it is listed as a species of special concern and is believed to be extirpated. It was described by Augustus Radcliffe Grote in 1874.

Larval foods
Larvae of extinct northern populations ate mostly, probably virtually entirely, witch-hazel (Hamamelis). Southern extant populations are associated with witch hazel as well, but some might use Fothergilla.

Adult foods
Adults of this genus often visit sap flows of maples and birches.  They almost certainly depend heavily on red maple flowers.

References

Cuculliinae